Ardeleanu is Romanian surname. It may refer to the following people:

 Carol Ardeleanu, Romanian writer
 Iosif Ardeleanu, Austro-Hungarian-born Romanian communist activist 
 Ștefan Ardeleanu, Romanian fencer
 Suzana Ardeleanu, Romanian fencer

See also 
 Ardelean

Romanian-language surnames